Samuel Ladyman (3 March 1643 – 23 February 1684) was an Anglican priest in Ireland.

Ladyman was born in Dinton, Buckinghamshire and received his education at Corpus Christi College, Oxford. Ladyman held the position of Archdeacon of Limerick from 1667 until his death.

References

Archdeacons of Limerick
Alumni of Corpus Christi College, Oxford
17th-century Irish Anglican priests
18th-century Irish Anglican priests
1643 births
1684 deaths
People from Buckinghamshire